This is a list of members of the Swiss Council of States during the 47th legislature (2003–2007). Most members were elected in the 2003 Swiss federal election.

Presidents

2003/2004: Franz Schiesser
2004/2005: Bruno Frick
2005/2006: Rolf Büttiker
2006/2007: Peter Bieri

Members

Notes

See also
List of members of the Swiss National Council (2003-2007)
List of members of the Swiss Council of States (current)

2003